The Teenie Beanies are miniature Beanie Babies that were offered in McDonald's promotions in and alongside happy meals from 1997 to 2000s onward.

Teenie Beanies were most in demand the first year they were offered (1997) one year before the height of the beanie baby craze, but demand steadily declined in popularity every year thereafter, even though the amount produced each time actually increased.

During the peak of their popularity (1998), Teenie Beanies were the cause of many fights at various McDonald's locations, resulting in police calls, criminal charges, and injuries. among these incidents included a Miami area McDonald's employee, who was charged with the theft of the toys. 

Though originally acquired through the purchase of a Happy Meal (and for around 2$ additional charge for each release of specialty babies 1999 onwards) they were often sold for much higher prices on the secondary market after the promotion.

Teenie Beanie Babies returned to McDonald's in July 2009, featuring Beanie Babies 2.0, the subseries of Ty Beanie Babies. Consumers could log onto ty.com and play online with their new Teenie Beanie as a marketing decision to raise public awareness and garner interest in the Beanie Babies 2.0 virtual pets. Originally, there was a 30-day trial period for playing with the toys online, but now the company has decided to allow consumers to keep their virtual pets for an undisclosed period of time (albeit indefinite).

An all-new line of Teenie Beanie Boos, a miniaturized version of the popular Beanie Baby spin-off with large eyes, were introduced to McDonald's in July 2014 and late May 2017. Another line, called Teenie Teeny Tys, was released in late March 2019.

List of releases:

1997

•Patti the Platypus 

•Pinky the flamingo 

•Chops the lamb 

•Chocolate the moose 

•Goldie the goldfish 

•Speedy the turtle 

•Seamore the seal 

•Snort the bull

•Quacks the duck 

•Lizz the Lizard

1998

•Doby the Dog

•Bongo the Monkey 

•Twigs the giraffe 

•Inch the Inch worm 

•Pinchers the lobster 

•Happy the hippo 

•Mel the koala 

•Scoop the pelican 

•Bones the dog

•Zip the cat

•Peanut the elephant

1999

•Freckles the leopard 

•Antsy the anteater 

•Smoochy the Frog

•Spunkey the cocker spaniel 

•Rocket the blue jay

•Iggy the iguana 

•Strut the rooster 

•Nuts the squirrel 

•Claude the crab

•Stretchy the Ostrich

•Nook the husky 

•Chip the cat

(1999) international bears

•Britannia (Britain)

•Erin (Ireland)

•Glory (United states)

•Maple (Canada)

•Glory "crew" edition, offered to mcdonald's employees during the promotion, with a differing tag than the original glory. 

2000

Pet Pals:

•Lips the fish

•Slither the snake

•Flip the cat

•Dotty the dalmatian

Garden Bunch:

•Lucky the ladybug

•Bumble the bee

•Spinner the spider

•Flitter the butterfly

At the Zoo:

•Tusk the walrus

•Blizz the tiger 

•Spike the rhino

•Schweetheart the monkey

Under the Sea:

•Neon the seahorse

•Coral the fish

•Sting the stingray

•Goochy the jellyfish

Top Secret:

•Springy the bunny

•Bushy the lion

2000 Super Stars 

Dinosaur Trio:

•Rex (Box: Front / Back)

•Bronty (Box: Front / Back)

•Steg (Box: Front / Back)

International Bears ||:

•Osito (Mexico) (Box: Front / Back)

•Germania (Germany) (Box: Front / Back)

•Spangle (United States) (Box: Front / Back)

Legends:

•Royal Blue Peanut (Box: Front / Back)

•Chilly (Box: Front / Back)

•Humphrey (Box: Front / Back)

The End Bear:

•The End Bear (Box: Front / Back)

USA Trio:

•Libearty (Box: Front / Back)

•Righty (Box: Front / Back)

•Lefty (Box: Front / Back)

McHappy Day:

•Millenim (Box: Front / Back)

See also
List of promotions by McDonald's

References

External links
Complete list of Teenie Beanies with images at Stashmatic.com collection tracker
Teenie Beanie Boos with images at Ty Collector

1990s toys
2000s toys
2010s toys
Beanie Babies
McDonald's
Products introduced in 1996